Marquess of La Romana is a hereditary title in the Peerage of Spain accompanied by the dignity of Grandee, granted in 1739 by Philip V to José Caro, son of the Baron of the lordships of Moixent and Novelda.

The title makes reference to the town of La Romana, in Alicante.

Marquesses of La Romana (1739)

José Caro y Maza de Lizana, 1st Marquess of La Romana (d. 1741)
Pedro Caro y Fontes, 2nd Marquess of La Romana (1717-1775), son of the 1st Marquess
Pedro Caro y Sureda, 3rd Marquess of La Romana (1761-1811), son of the 2nd Marquess
Pedro Caro y Salas, 4th Marquess of La Romana (d. 1855), son of the 3rd Marquess
Pedro Caro y Álvarez de Toledo, 5th Marquess of La Romana (1827-1890), son of the 4th Marquess
Pedro Caro y Széchényi, 6th Marquess of La Romana (1849-1916), son of the 5th Marquess
Pedro Caro y Martínez de Irujo, 7th Marquess of La Romana (1884-1965), son of the 6th Marquess
María de la Piedad Caro y Martínez de Irujo, 8th Marchioness of La Romana (1884-1965), daughter of the 6th Marquess
Diego del Alcázar y Caro, 9th Marquess of La Romana (1925-1994), son of the 8th Marchioness
Diego del Alcázar y Silvela, 10th Marquess of La Romana (b. 1950), son of the 9th Marquess

See also
List of current Grandees of Spain
IE Business School

References

Grandees of Spain
Marquesses of Spain
Lists of Spanish nobility
Noble titles created in 1739